Mr. Vampire III, (Chinese: 靈幻先生) also known as Mr. Vampire Part 3, is a 1987 Hong Kong comedy horror film directed by Ricky Lau and produced by Sammo Hung. The film is the third of a series of five films directed by Ricky Lau in the Mr. Vampire franchise. The Chinese title of the film literally translates to Mr. Spiritual Fantasy.

Plot
One dark night, Uncle Ming attempts to exorcise angry spirits in a haunted house but is unsuccessful and he narrowly escapes. He brings his two ghostly companions (Big Pao and Small Pao) with him to a nearby town. The town is under attack by a group of bandits with supernatural powers. The thugs are led by Devil Lady, a powerful evil witch doctor.

When Ming and the Paos are having dinner in a restaurant, Captain Chiang comes to harass them, and the Paos take revenge by playing tricks on Chiang. Just then, Chiang's master, Uncle Nine, appears and he subdues the two ghosts and traps them inside a wine jar. As Ming is no match for Nine in magic powers, he pleads with Nine to release the Paos. Nine agrees to set the ghosts free but warns Ming that he must part ways with them. Big Pao is captured by Devil Lady later due to Chiang's act of mischief. Devil Lady casts a spell on Big Pao, making him see people dressed in Taoist robes as monster birds, and sends him to attack the town.

During the chaos, Devil Lady breaks into the town prison to free two of her bandits who were captured earlier by the townspeople, but falls into a trap instead. Uncle Nine defeats Devil Lady in a fight and the evil sorceress falls into a well and dies. However, the spirits of the two bandits escape and possess two men, and go out to cause trouble again. Nine and Ming combine forces to contain the evil spirits in wine jars and fry them in hot oil. Just then, the coin sword binding Devil Lady shatters and the sorceress' spirit is set free to take revenge. Eventually after a long battle, with the help of the Pao ghosts, Nine and Ming succeed in destroying Devil Lady once and for all.

Cast
Lam Ching-ying as Uncle Nine, a unibrowed Taoist priest
Richard Ng as Uncle Ming, an inept Taoist priest
Billy Lau as Captain Chiang, Uncle Nine's student
David Lui as Big Pao, one of Uncle Ming's two ghost companions
Agassi Wang as Devil Lady, a powerful evil witch doctor
Chow Gam-kong as Shou, one of the two possessed men
Tam Yat-ching as the haunted house's owner
Hoh Kin-wai as Small Pao, one of Uncle Ming's two ghost companions
Cheung Wing-cheung as Eagle Head, one of the bandits
Ka Lee as a townsman
Baan Yun-sang as Te, Uncle Nine's student killed by Devil Lady
Lee Chi-git as Fu, one of the two possessed men
Chu Tau as Wild Boar, one of the bandits
Gam Biu as a drunk villager
Pang Yun-cheung as a townsman
Siu Hung-moi as the female ghost in the wine jar set free by Uncle Ming
Yip So as a ghost in the haunted house
Chun Kwai-bo
Ha Kwok-wing
Lau Fong-sai
Lam Foo-wai

Guest stars
Sammo Hung as Hung, one of Uncle Nine's birthday guests
Wu Ma as Uncle Nine's birthday guest
Corey Yuen as Uncle Nine's birthday guest
Teddy Yip as Uncle Nine's birthday guest

Box office
Mr Vampire 3 ran 17 December 1987 to 6 January 1988 and grossed HK$19,460,536.00 at the box office.

Home Media

VHS

Laserdisc

VCD

DVD

Blu-ray

References

External links
 
 
 Mr. Vampire III at Hong Kong Cinemagic
 Mr. Vampire III on lovehkfilm.com

1980s comedy horror films
1987 films
Hong Kong comedy horror films
Hong Kong horror films
Mr. Vampire
Jiangshi films
Golden Harvest films
Martial arts horror films
Vampire comedy films
1987 comedy films
1980s Cantonese-language films
1980s Hong Kong films